The Marksburg is a castle above the town of Braubach in Rhineland-Palatinate, Germany. It is one of the principal sites of the Rhine Gorge UNESCO World Heritage Site. The fortress was used for protection rather than as a residence for royal families. It has a striking example of a bergfried designed as a butter-churn tower. Of the 40 hill castles between Bingen am Rhein and Koblenz the Marksburg was one of only two which had never been destroyed (the other being Maus Castle) and at least the only one that had never fallen into disrepair.

History

Middle Ages
A stone keep was built on the spot in 1100 by the Eppstein family and expanded into a castle around 1117 to protect the town of Braubach and to reinforce the customs facilities. It was first mentioned in documents in 1231. The Eppsteins were a powerful family in the region, with several members becoming archbishops in Mainz and Trier. In 1283, Count Eberhard of Katzenelnbogen bought it and throughout the 14th and 15th century the high noble counts rebuilt the castle constantly.
In 1429 the male line of the Counts of Katzenelnbogen became extinct, and the territories went to the Count of Hesse, who expanded the castle to accommodate artillery and added the round towers of the outer curtain wall.

19th century
The French emperor Napoleon seized then abolished the Holy Roman Empire in 1806. He gave the Marksburg to his ally the Duke of Nassau for his service. He used the castle as a prison and as a home for disabled soldiers. After the Austro-Prussian War of 1866 the Duchy of Nassau became a territory of Prussia, which took ownership of the Marksburg.

Modern era
In 1900, the castle was sold for a symbolic price of 1,000 Goldmarks to the German Castles Association (Deutschen Burgenvereinigung), which had been founded a year earlier as a private initiative to preserve castles in Germany. The Marksburg has been the head office of this organisation since 1931.

In March 1945, the castle was badly damaged by American artillery from across the Rhine.

In the 1990s, a copy of the Marksburg was created for the Ueno German Culture Village in Japan, after the owner of the castle declined to demolish the original and rebuild it in Japan.

Notes

Sources

External links

Official site
Aerial views of the Marksburg castle

Castles in Rhineland-Palatinate
Museums in Rhineland-Palatinate
Historic house museums in Germany
Hill castles